This list of tallest buildings in Bengaluru ranks High-rise buildings and Skyscrapers in Bengaluru, India.

Bengaluru is witnessing a huge high-rise boom with many skyscrapers being built in different parts of the city. Being the Technology capital of India makes it one of the fastest growing mega cities in the world. Influx of high-skilled individuals from all around India came here for job and business opportunities, So there is always demand for office and living space within the city, as a result Bengaluru is moving towards vertical development . Mantri Pinnacle (topped out in August 2013) is currently the tallest building in the city. The World Trade Center, the UB Tower, the CNTC Presidential Tower, and Phoenix One Bangalore West are some of the various prominent skyscrapers in the city.

As of now there are almost 1,500 high-rises that have already been constructed in Bengaluru and many more high-rise buildings are currently under construction in the city right now.

Tallest buildings
This lists ranks buildings in Bengaluru that stand at least  or 30 floors from the ground. This includes spires and architectural details but does not include antenna masts. Only completed buildings and under-construction buildings that have been topped out are included.

Tallest under construction

This list ranks buildings that are under construction in Bangalore and are planned to rise up to at least 30 floors. This includes spires and architectural details but does not include antenna masts. Buildings that are only approved, on hold, or proposed are not included in this table.

Approved, proposed, and on hold
This list ranks buildings that are approved, on hold, or proposed and are planned to be at least 30 floors tall.

Timeline of tallest buildings of Bangalore

See also

 List of tallest buildings in Mangalore
 List of tallest buildings in India
 List of tallest buildings in different cities in India

References

External links
 Buildings in Bangalore, Emporis.com

Buildings, tallest
Tallest
Bangalore
Tallest buildings in Bangalore